Luminance is a photometric measure of the density of luminous intensity in a given direction, measured in candela per square metre (cd/m2).

Luminance may also refer to:
Relative luminance, luminance normalized with respect to a reference white
Luma (video), an approximation of relative luminance, used in video signals

See also
 Illuminance
 Luminescence (disambiguation)